The women's 10,000 metres walk event at the 2000 World Junior Championships in Athletics was held in Santiago, Chile, at Estadio Nacional Julio Martínez Prádanos on 20 October.

Medalists

Results

Final
20 October

Participation
According to an unofficial count, 28 athletes from 22 countries participated in the event.

References

10,000 metres walk
Racewalking at the World Athletics U20 Championships